Shut Up and Die Like an Aviator is a live album by Steve Earle and the Dukes. The album was released in 1991 and recorded live in London and Kitchener (misspelled in the liner notes as "Kitchner") Ontario, Canada, in October 1990.

Track listing
All songs written by Steve Earle unless otherwise noted.
"Intro" - 0:53
"Good Ol' Boy (Gettin' Tough)" - 4:23 (Earle, Richard Bennett)
"Devil's Right Hand" - 3:06
"I Ain't Ever Satisfied" - 4:07
"Someday" - 3:54
"West Nashville Boogie" - 7:25
"Snake Oil" - 3:02
"Standin' on the Corner (Blue Yodel No. 9)" - 1:36 (Jimmie Rodgers)
"The Other Kind" - 5:35
"Billy Austin" - 7:08
"Copperhead Road" - 4:34
"Fearless Heart" - 4:36
"Guitar Town" - 3:36
"I Love You Too Much" - 5:37
"She's About a Mover" - 4:14 (Doug Sahm)
"The Rain Came Down" - 4:50 (Earle, Michael Woody)
"Dead Flowers" - 8:15 (Mick Jagger, Keith Richards)

Personnel
Steve Earle -  lead vocals, electric and acoustic guitars, 6 string bass, mandolin

The Dukes
Bucky Baxter - steel guitar, electric and acoustic guitars, 6 string bass
Zip Gibson - electric guitar, background vocals
Kelly Looney - bass, background vocals
Stacey Earle Mims - background vocals, acoustic guitar, percussion
Ken Moore - keyboards
Craig Wright - drums
Kurt Custer - background vocals on "Fearless Heart"

References

Steve Earle live albums
1991 live albums
MCA Records live albums